Daptonema is a genus of nematodes belonging to the family Xyalidae.

The genus has cosmopolitan distribution.

Species:

Daptonema acanthospiculum 
Daptonema acrilabiatum 
Daptonema adiecta 
Daptonema aegypticum 
Daptonema altaicum 
Daptonema altaicus 
Daptonema alternum 
Daptonema amphorum 
Daptonema angulatum 
Daptonema aquadulcis 
Daptonema aquaedulcis 
Daptonema arcospiculum 
Daptonema arcticus 
Daptonema articulatum 
Daptonema australis 
Daptonema balatum 
Daptonema bathylaimum 
Daptonema biggi 
Daptonema biwaensis 
Daptonema borealis 
Daptonema brevisetosum 
Daptonema buelkiensis 
Daptonema buetschlioides 
Daptonema calcaneus 
Daptonema calceolatum 
Daptonema chesapeakensis 
Daptonema chonispiculum 
Daptonema circulum 
Daptonema circumscriptum 
Daptonema clavicaudatum 
Daptonema concordiense 
Daptonema conicum 
Daptonema crassissima 
Daptonema crassissimus 
Daptonema curticauda 
Daptonema curvatus 
Daptonema curvispicula 
Daptonema curvispiculum 
Daptonema cuspidospiculum 
Daptonema dentatum 
Daptonema dihystera 
Daptonema divertens 
Daptonema dolichurus 
Daptonema donghaiensis 
Daptonema donsi 
Daptonema dubium 
Daptonema durum 
Daptonema ecphygmaticum 
Daptonema elaboratum 
Daptonema elegans 
Daptonema elongatum 
Daptonema erectum 
Daptonema eximium 
Daptonema exutum 
Daptonema fallax 
Daptonema filicaudatus 
Daptonema filispiculum 
Daptonema fimbriatus 
Daptonema fissidens 
Daptonema fistulatum 
Daptonema flagellicauda 
Daptonema floridanum 
Daptonema foetidum 
Daptonema fortis 
Daptonema frigidum 
Daptonema furcatum 
Daptonema galeatum 
Daptonema gracillimecaudatus 
Daptonema grahami 
Daptonema gritsenkovi 
Daptonema groenlandicum 
Daptonema gyrophorum 
Daptonema heterum 
Daptonema hirsutum 
Daptonema hirtum 
Daptonema hyalocella 
Daptonema iners 
Daptonema intermedius 
Daptonema invagiferoum 
Daptonema inversum 
Daptonema karabugasensis 
Daptonema kornoeense 
Daptonema lata 
Daptonema laxum 
Daptonema leptogastrelloides 
Daptonema levis 
Daptonema limnobia 
Daptonema longiapophysis 
Daptonema longicaudatum 
Daptonema longissimecaudatum 
Daptonema lopezi 
Daptonema macrocirculus 
Daptonema maeoticum 
Daptonema marylinicus 
Daptonema miamiense 
Daptonema microspiculum 
Daptonema mirabilis 
Daptonema modestum 
Daptonema nannospiculus 
Daptonema nanum 
Daptonema naviculivorus 
Daptonema nearticulatum 
Daptonema normandicum 
Daptonema norvegicus 
Daptonema notoistospiculoides 
Daptonema notosetosus 
Daptonema obesum 
Daptonema obesus 
Daptonema osadchikae 
Daptonema osadchikhae 
Daptonema ostentator 
Daptonema oxycerca 
Daptonema oxyuroides 
Daptonema papillatus 
Daptonema papillifera 
Daptonema parabreviseta 
Daptonema paracircumscriptum 
Daptonema paradonsi 
Daptonema paraelaboratum 
Daptonema paramonovi 
Daptonema paraoxyuroides 
Daptonema paratortum 
Daptonema paroistospiculoides 
Daptonema phuketense 
Daptonema planiere 
Daptonema platonovae 
Daptonema polaris 
Daptonema procerum 
Daptonema prominens 
Daptonema proprium 
Daptonema psammoides 
Daptonema pseudotortum 
Daptonema pumilus 
Daptonema rectangulatum 
Daptonema resimum 
Daptonema rigidum 
Daptonema robustus 
Daptonema romanelloi 
Daptonema rusticum 
Daptonema salinae 
Daptonema salvum 
Daptonema sanctimarteni 
Daptonema securum 
Daptonema septentrionalis 
Daptonema setifer 
Daptonema setihyalocella 
Daptonema setosum 
Daptonema sibiricum 
Daptonema simplex 
Daptonema sinuosus 
Daptonema sphaerolaimoides 
Daptonema spirum 
Daptonema stylosum 
Daptonema svalbardense 
Daptonema tenuispiculum 
Daptonema timmi 
Daptonema timoshkini 
Daptonema tortum 
Daptonema tortuosum 
Daptonema trabeculosum 
Daptonema trecuspidatum 
Daptonema trichinus 
Daptonema trichospiculum 
Daptonema uncinatus 
Daptonema variasetosum 
Daptonema vicinum 
Daptonema vietnamensis 
Daptonema voskresenskii 
Daptonema williamsi 
Daptonema xyaliforme

References

Nematodes